"Ready for the Good Life" is a song by English singer Paloma Faith. It was released on 7 November 2014 as the fourth single to promote her third studio album, A Perfect Contradiction (2014). The song was written by Faith, Klas Åhlund, Adam Baptiste, Måns Wredenberg, Linus Wiklund. Production of the song was handled by Åhlund. No music video was made for the single.

Faith has performed the single on Jools' Annual Hootenanny, and during the Paloma Faith Autumn Tour 2014. The song was also featured on the soundtrack for the Absolutely Fabulous: The Movie.

Track listing
Digital download
 "Ready for the Good Life" – 3:25

Charts

Release history

References

Paloma Faith songs
2014 singles
2014 songs
Sony Music singles
Songs written by Paloma Faith
Songs written by Klas Åhlund
Songs written by Adam Baptiste
Songs written by Linus Wiklund